Rex Rashley (1894–1972) was a British character actor who appeared regularly on The Morecambe & Wise Show (1968) often dressed in familiar stars' attire as part of a joke.  For instance, he appeared in cowboy hat, spurs and sheriff's star on stage, with Morecambe advising Wise that he was "John Wayne's Son" - the joke being that Rashley was elderly and clearly several years older than Wayne himself.

Filmography

External links
 

British male television actors
Morecambe and Wise
1894 births
1972 deaths
20th-century British comedians